Parker Island is a roughly  island in the Southern Gulf Islands of British Columbia, Canada. It forms the western side of Montague Harbour, sheltering it from the strong wind gusts of Trincomali Channel.  The island may be reached by floatplane, private boat, helicopter or water taxi; there is no public ferry service.

Parker Island is named after Lieutenant George Ferdinand Hastings Parker of HMS Ganges, flagship of the Royal Navy's Pacific Station, which was based in Esquimalt.

Parker Island has approximately 25 residents. Half of these residents live there part-time, due to the island's rustic grounds and harsh weather conditions.

See also
 List of islands of British Columbia

References

Islands of the Gulf Islands